Psychiatrist may refer to:
A psychiatrist, a physician who specializes in the clinical field of psychiatry
The Royal College of Psychiatrists, the main professional organisation of psychiatrists in the United Kingdom and Ireland
Psychiatrist (game), or "Psycho"; a party game

See also 
The Psychiatrist (disambiguation)